Brethren is a name adopted by a wide range of mainly Christian religious groups throughout history. The largest movement is Anabaptist.

Late Middle Ages
Apostolic Brethren (13th century), mendicant order similar to the Franciscans
Kalands Brethren (13th century), German charitable organization
Brethren of the Free Spirit (13th century), mystical reform movement
The Brethren of the Common Life (14th century), intentional communities dedicated to service
 The Moravian Church, also known as United Brethren, Unitas Fratrum, and Bohemian Brethren, descend from the followers of Jan Hus, a Czech reformer burned at the stake in 1415 and Bohemian 15th-century nobleman and theologian Petr Chelčický
The Unity of the Brethren, also traces its roots to the work of Hus and Chelčický

Anabaptist groups
These groups grew out of the Anabaptist movement at the time of the Protestant Reformation (16th century).

The Hutterites, also known as Hutterian Brethren, originated from German, Swiss, and Tyrolean Anabaptists led by Jacob Hutter in the 1520s
The Swiss Brethren, the name Swiss Anabaptists used from 1525 until their split into Amish and Mennonite groups in 1693
The Mennonite Brethren, originated among Russian Mennonites in 1860

Schwarzenau Brethren
The Schwarzenau Brethren originated in 1708 in Schwarzenau, Bad Berleburg, Germany, with Alexander Mack. Their roots are in the Radical Pietism movement but they were strongly influenced by Anabaptist theology. They have also been called "Dunkers" or "German Baptist Brethren". The group split into three wings in 1881–1883:

Traditionalists 
Old German Baptist Brethren, part of the Old Order Movement
Old Brethren, a denomination that split from the Old German Baptist Brethren in 1913 and 1915
Old Brethren German Baptist, also known as Leedyites, the most conservative denomination of Schwarzenau Brethren. They live in Indiana and Missouri
Old Order German Baptist Brethren, a small very conservative denomination
Old German Baptist Brethren, New Conference, formed in 2009 as a result of a split among the Old German Baptist Brethren

Conservatives 
Church of the Brethren, based in Elgin, Illinois
Dunkard Brethren, a small conservative denomination that withdrew from the Church of the Brethren in 1926

Progressives 
The Brethren Church, based in Ashland, Ohio
Fellowship of Grace Brethren Churches, former name of Charis Fellowship, a theologically conservative denomination that split from the Brethren Church in 1939
Conservative Grace Brethren Churches, International, a conservative denomination that separated from the Fellowship of Grace Brethren Churches

River Brethren
The River Brethren have their origins in the ministries of Mennonite Bishop Jacob Engle and Mennonite Pastor Martin Boehm, beginning in Lancaster County, Pennsylvania in the latter half of the 18th century. They were also influenced by the Schwarzenau Brethren and include (amongst others):
Brethren in Christ Church, an Anabaptist Christian denomination with roots in the Mennonite church, pietism, and Wesleyan holiness. They have also been known as River Brethren and River Mennonites
Church of the United Brethren in Christ, an evangelical denomination based in Huntington, Indiana. 
Old Order River Brethren

Former River Brethren 
They merged with United Methodist Church in 1968:
Church of the United Brethren in Christ (New Constitution)
Evangelical United Brethren

Plymouth Brethren
The Plymouth Brethren originated in the 1820s work of John Nelson Darby and others in Ireland, the United Kingdom, and India. Plymouth Brethren divided into two branches in 1848:
Exclusive Brethren
Plymouth Brethren Christian Church, also known as Raven-Taylor-Hales Brethren
Local churches (affiliation), also known as Church Assembly Hall
Open Brethren
Gospel Hall Brethren, also known as Gospel Hall Assemblies
Needed Truth Brethren, also known as Churches of God
Indian Brethren, an Evangelical premillennial religious movement
Kerala Brethren, Assembly, also known as Verbada Sabha

Other religious groups
Apostolic United Brethren, a Mormon fundamentalist group
The Brethren (Jim Roberts group), an apocalyptic Jesus people movement from the 1970s
Brethren of Purity, a secret society of Muslim philosophers in the 8th or 10th century CE
The Church of the Lutheran Brethren of America is a Pietistic Lutheran denomination that emerged during 19th-century spiritual awakening among Lutheran congregations in the upper Midwestern United States. They formed a separate synod in 1900.
Evangelical Church of Czech Brethren, a Czech Lutheran–Reformed Protestant church
The Polish Brethren, also known as Socinians, were an Anti-trinitarian group, forerunners for the Unitarians
The Social Brethren originated in Saline County, Illinois in 1867, the result of an attempt to put the slavery issue away in favor of uniting on a common belief in the death, burial, and resurrection of Jesus Christ
Studite Brethren, a society in the Ukrainian Greek Catholic Church
United Brethren, a group of Methodists who later joined the Church of Jesus Christ of Latter-day Saints
The United Seventh-Day Brethren,  an Adventist body
"The Brethren", a collective name for the general authorities of the Church of Jesus Christ of Latter-day Saints